Several sports team in Kansas City, Missouri have used the name Cowboys:

Kansas City Cowboys (Union Association), a baseball team in the Union Association in 1884
Kansas City Cowboys (National League), a baseball team in the National League in 1886
Kansas City Cowboys (Western Association), an early minor league baseball team
Kansas City Cowboys (American Association), a baseball team in the American Association in 1888–89
Kansas City Cowboys (20th century baseball), a 20th-century minor baseball team
Kansas City Cowboys (NFL), a 1920s National Football League team